"My Heaven" is the first Japanese single by South Korean boy band, Big Bang released under YG Entertainment and Universal Music Japan. The single is a Japanese version of the group's previous song "천국" ("Heaven") from their extended play, Stand Up (2008).

My Heaven's music video started filming from 27 to 28 April 2009 and premiered May 11, 2009. The music video is about the break-up between G-Dragon and his girlfriend. The girl featured in the music video is the Japanese actress and model Mayuko Kawakita.

Track listing

Release history

References

External links 
Big Bang Official Website
Big Bang Japan Official Website
Big Bang by Universal Music Japan

BigBang (South Korean band) songs
2009 singles
YG Entertainment singles
Universal Music Japan singles
Japanese-language songs
Songs written by G-Dragon
Songs with lyrics by Shoko Fujibayashi
2009 songs